Hendrik Caspar Romberg (bapt. 11 October 1744 - 15 April 1793)   was a Dutch bookkeeper, merchant-trader and VOC Opperhoofd in Japan.

Life
Hendrik Caspar Romberg was the son of Zacharias Romberg, a bookprinter/seller on Spui in Amsterdam. Hendrik was baptized not in the opposite Lutheran church, but at home. In 1763 he traveled to Batavia in East Asia with the Dutch East Indies Company (or Vereenigde Oost-Indische Compagnie or VOC in Dutch). Ten years later he was appointed in Deshima as bookkeeper.  Romberg spent more than ten years in Japan. It seems he was good-looking had an affair with a Japanese prostitute.

He was the Opperhoofd, head of VOC trading post, during four discrete periods:
 27 October 1782 – August 1783 
 November 84 – 21 November 1785
 21 November 1786 – 30 November 1787
 1 August 1789 – 13 November 1790

Romberg traveled five times to Edo. In an unknown year he attended a theater performance in Osaka. In April 1787 he presented the lord of Satsuma a sweet wine from Jurançon. In 1788 he met with Shiba Kōkan, interested in Western painting, and technique. Romberg's account of the Sangoku-maru is a scant record of the brief attempt by the Tokugawa shogunate to create a sea-going vessel in the 1780s.  The ship sank; and the tentative project was abandoned when the political climate in Edo shifted.

In the off-years, he spent time in Batavia, which was at that time the VOC headquarters in the East Indies. The registers  also listed him as chief warehouseman and paymaster.

Notes

References
 French, Calvin L. (1974).  Shiba Kōkan: artist, innovator, and pioneer in the westernization of Japan. New York: Weatherhill. ;   OCLC 1301516
 {{nihongo|Historiographical Institute, the University of Tokyo|東京大学史料編纂所|Tokyo daigaku shiryō hensan-jo}}. (1963). Historical documents relating to Japan in foreign countries: an inventory of microfilm acquisitions in the library of the Historiographical Institute, the University of Tokyo.'' OCLC  450710
 Lembaga Kebudajaan Indonesia, Bataviaasch Genootschap van Kunsten en Wetenschappen.  (1827). Verhandelingen,  Vol. 6. Bataviaasch: A.C. Nix & Co. OCLC 221461228
 Screech, Timon. (2006).   Secret Memoirs of the Shoguns: Isaac Titsingh and Japan, 1779-1822. London: RoutledgeCurzon. 	;   OCLC 65177072

1744 births
1793 deaths
Dutch chiefs of factory in Japan
Dutch expatriates in Japan
Dutch East India Company people from Amsterdam